Prague 19, also known as Kbely, is a municipal district in Prague. It is located in the north-eastern part of the city. It is formed by one cadastre, Kbely. , there were 6,149 inhabitants living in Prague 19.

The administrative district of the same name consists of municipal districts Prague 19, Satalice and Vinoř.

See also 
Prague Aviation Museum, Kbely

External links 
 Prague 19 - Kbely - Official homepage

Districts of Prague